The tenge ( or ; , ; sign: ₸ ; code: KZT) is the currency of Kazakhstan. It is divided into 100 tiyn ( also transliterated as tiyin).

History
After the breakup of the Soviet Union in December 1991, most of the formerly Soviet republics attempted to maintain a common currency. Some politicians hoped to at least maintain "special relations" among former Soviet republics (the "near abroad"). Other reasons were the economic considerations for maintaining the ruble zone. The wish to preserve strong trade relations between former Soviet republics was considered the most important goal.

The break-up of the Soviet Union was not accompanied by any formal changes in monetary arrangements. The Central Bank of Russia was authorized to take over the State Bank of the USSR (Gosbank) on 1 January 1992. It continued to ship Soviet notes and coins to the central banks of the eleven newly independent countries, which had formerly been the main branches of Gosbank in the republics.

The political situation, however, was not favourable for maintaining a common currency. Maintaining a common currency requires a strong political consensus in respect to monetary and fiscal targets, a common institution in charge of implementing these targets, and some minimum of common legislation (concerning the banking and foreign-exchange regulations). These conditions were far from being met amidst the turbulent economic and political situation.

During the first half of 1992, there existed a monetary union where 15 independent states all used the ruble. Since it was clear that the situation would not last, each of them was using its position as "free-riders" to issue huge amounts of money in the form of credit. As a result, some countries were issuing coupons in order to "protect" their markets from buyers from other states. The Russian central bank responded in July 1992 by setting up restrictions to the flow of credit between Russia and other states. The final collapse of the ruble zone began when Russia pulled out with the exchange of banknotes by the Central Bank of Russia on Russian territory at the end of July 1993.

As a result, Kazakhstan and other countries still in the ruble zone were "pushed out". On November 12, 1993, the President of Kazakhstan issued a decree "On introducing national currency of Republic of Kazakhstan". The tenge was introduced on 15 November 1993 to replace Soviet currency at a rate of T 1 = Rbls 500. In 1991 a "special group" of designers was set up: Mendybay Alin, Timur Suleymenov, Asimsaly Duzelkhanov and Khayrulla Gabzhalilov. Thus November 15 is celebrated as the "Day of National Currency of Republic of Kazakhstan". In 1995 a tenge-printing factory opened in Kazakhstan. The first consignment of tenge banknotes were printed in the United Kingdom and the first coins were struck in Germany. In February 2019, Kazakh President Nursultan Nazarbayev signed a bill into law that will remove all Russian captions from future tenge banknotes and coins.

Etymology
The word tenge in Kazakh and in most other Turkic languages means a set of scales (cf the old Uzbek tenga or the Tajik borrowed term tanga). The origin of the word is the Mongolic word teng (ᠲᠡᠩ) which means "being equal, balance". The name of this currency is thus similar to the pound, lira, peso, taka, and shekel. The name of the currency is also related to the Russian word for money / , which the Old Russian language borrowed from Turkic sources.

Symbol

Originally a simple letter "Т" was used to denote amounts in tenge, this is still recommended when the tenge symbol is not available. In autumn 2006 the National Bank of Kazakhstan organised a competition for a unique symbol for the currency and received over 30,000 applications.
On March 20, 2007, two days before the Nauryz holiday, the National Bank of Kazakhstan approved a graphical symbol for the tenge: ₸.  
On March 29, 2007, the Bank announced two designers from Almaty, Vadim Davydenko and Sanzhar Amirkhanov, as winners for the design of the symbol of the Kazakhstani tenge. They shared a prize of ₸1,000,000 and the title of "parents" of the tenge symbol.
The character was included in Unicode 5.2.0 (August 2009) at code point U+20B8.

Coins 
While older coins were struck in Germany, current coins are struck domestically, by the Kazakhstan Mint in Oskemen.

First series (1993)
In 1993, the first series of coins were introduced in denominations of 2, 5, 10, 20, and 50 tiyin featuring the national arms and were struck in bronze. The coins of T 1, T 3, T 5, T 10, and T 20 were struck in cupro-nickel and depicted stylized and mythical animals. The coins of this period circulated alongside tiyin and low denomination tenge notes of equal value. Tiyin coins were withdrawn as of February 7, 2001 and lost their effect as legal currency as of December 31, 2012.

Second series (1998)

In 1998, a new series of coins was introduced. After the withdrawal of tiyin denominated coins T 1 became the smallest denomination. T 100 were later introduced in 2002 replacing the equivalent notes. A T 2 coin was introduced in 2005. In 2013 the alloy of lower denomination coins was altered.

Third series (2019)
In 2019, a new series of coins was introduced into circulation, with the same coin specifications and metallic compositions as the second series. But with the inscriptions of the coins now rendered in Latin-based Kazakh instead of Kazakh-based Cyrillic.

The coins were issued as part of the efforts of the presidential decree issued by former President Nursultan Nazarbayev of its transition of switching from a Cyrillic-based alphabet to a Latin-based alphabet and emphasizing Kazakh culture and distance the country from Russian influence. The designs of the coins were approved by Interim President Kassym-Jomart Tokayev on March 20, 2019. Previously issued coins bearing the Kazakh Cyrillic script will remain legal tender alongside the new Kazakh Latin inscribed coins. 
In 2019, the National Bank of Kazakhstan announced the issuance of new ₸200 coins, which were issued into circulation in 2020. This new denomination features inscriptions in Latin-based Kazakh, and like the ₸100 coin, is bQasi-metallic.

Commemorative coins
Commemorative coins are issued in denominations of ₸20, ₸50, ₸100, ₸500, ₸1,000, ₸2,500, ₸5,000 and ₸10,000. Silver and gold bullion coins exist in denominations of ₸1, ₸2, ₸5, ₸10, ₸20, ₸50 and ₸100. Many of the ₸20 and ₸50 commemoratives are also struck in cupro-nickel and occasionally make it out into general circulation as a side coinage with face value.

Banknotes

1993 series

On 15 November 1993, the National Bank of Kazakhstan issued notes in denominations of 1, 2, 5, 10, 20, and 50 tiyn, T 1, T 3, T 5, T 10, T 20, and T 50; T 100 notes followed shortly thereafter. These were followed in 1994 by T 200, T 500, and T 1,000 notes. T 2,000 notes were introduced in 1996, with T 5,000 in 1999 and T 10,000 on 28 July 2003. Notes currently in circulation are:

₸200 - portrait of Al-Farabi
₸500 - portrait of Al-Farabi, fragment of Khodzha Akhmet Yassaui mausoleum
₸1,000 - portrait of Al-Farabi
₸2,000 - portrait of Al-Farabi
₸5,000 - portrait of Al-Farabi
₸10,000 - portrait of Al-Farabi, image of snow leopard.

The text on the reverse side of the 200 tenge banknote is written in Kazakh, although text on the reverse sides of the other banknotes is written in Russian.

2006 series 

The National Bank of Kazakhstan issued a new series of tenge banknotes in 2006. This was not a currency reform as they replaced existing notes at face value.

The 2006 series is far more exotic than its predecessors. The obverse is vertical and the denomination is written in Kazakh. All denominations depict the Astana/Nur-Sultan Bayterek monument, the flag of Kazakhstan, the Coat of arms, the handprint with a signature of president Nursultan Nazarbayev and fragments of the national anthem. The main differences across each denomination are only the colours, denominations and underprint patterns.

On the contrast, the reverse side of the notes are more different. The denomination is written in Russian, and each denomination shows a unique building and geography of Kazakhstan in the outline of its borders.

The first printing of the ₸2,000 and ₸5,000 notes issued in 2006 had misspellings of the word for "bank" (the correct spelling "" bankı was misspelled "*" banqı). The misspelling was a politically sensitive issue due to the cultural and political importance of the Kazakh language.

On 3 October 2016, the ₸2,000, ₸5,000 and ₸10,000 banknotes of the 2006 series lost their legal tender status and are no longer valid. From 4 October 2016 to 3 October 2017, these notes can be exchanged without commission at any second tier bank and branches of the National Bank of Kazakhstan.

2011–2017 series
The National Bank of Kazakhstan issued a new series of tenge banknotes dated 2011, 2012, 2013 and 2014 in denominations of ₸1,000, ₸2,000, ₸5,000, and ₸10,000. The designs for this series feature the "Kazakh Eli" monument on the front of the notes. On 1 December 2015, a new ₸20,000 banknote was introduced. It contains the issue date of 2013, and is a commemorative note to celebrate the 20th anniversary of the introduction of its national currency, but was not issued until 2015. In 2017, the National Bank of Kazakhstan issued a ₸500 banknote as part of this series, but has caused controversy over an image of a gull on the reverse side of the note and the image of the Moscow business center in Kazakhstan's capital of Nur-Sultan.

New series with security features 2008
Since 2008, a number of commemorative designs have been issued, including notes celebrating the 2011 Asian Winter Games hosted in Nur-Sultan. Commemoratives can typically be found in these denominations: ₸1,000, ₸2,000, ₸5,000, and ₸10,000.

Digital tenge
The National Bank of Kazakhstan publicly released plans to develop a national digital currency.

Commemorative banknotes
T 5,000 (2001)

₸5,000 (2008)

₸1,000 (2010)

₸1,000 (2011)

₸2,000 (2011)

₸10,000 (2011)

₸1,000 (2013)
1,000 tenge banknote issued in 2013 to commemorate the "Kul Tigin" – the monument of the Turkic runic writing.

₸10,000 (2016)
The National Bank of Kazakhstan issued a 10,000 tenge commemorative banknote to commemorate the 25th anniversary of independence from the Soviet Union. The commemorative note contains an image of Kazakh President Nursultan Nazarbayev, and was launched into circulation on the Day of the First President, December 1, 2016.

₸20,000 (2021)
The National Bank of Kazakhstan issued a 20,000 tenge commemorative banknote to commemorate the 30th anniversary of independence from the Soviet Union. The commemorative note features images of the first president of Kazakhstan, "Elbasy" Nursultan Nazarbayev, the Akorda Presidential Palace, a view of the capital city of Nur-Sultan and the official logo for the celebrations. The commemorative note is also the first to feature inscriptions in Kazakh-based Latin instead of Kazakh-based Cyrillic. The commemorative note was issued on December 16, 2021.

Exchange rates and inflation
On September 2, 2013, the National Bank of Kazakhstan moved the tenge from a managed float and pegged it to the US dollar and the Russian ruble.

On February 11, 2014, the Kazakh National Bank chose to devalue the tenge by 19% against the U.S. dollar in response to a weakening of the Russian ruble.

On August 20, 2015, The Kazakhstan National Bank has done away with the currency band with respect to conversion rate of tenge. Now, the tenge is a free-floating currency and its exchange rate against the major currencies are determined by demand and supply in the market. Due to this change, the tenge lost 30% of its value in a single day.

See also
 Economy of Kazakhstan

References

External links
 Currency exchange rates in Kazakhstan
 News from the National Bank of Kazakhstan

 The banknotes of Kazakhstan 
 Coins of Kazakhstan
 Banknotes of Kazakhstan
 Catalog of the coins of Kazakhstan (Numista)
 Kazakhstan Tenge: detailed catalog of banknotes
 

Economy of Kazakhstan
Currencies of Kazakhstan
Currencies introduced in 1993
Currency symbols